Saint Jerome is an oil-on-canvas painting by Dutch artist Matthias Stom. It was completed c. 1635 and is now in the Musee des Beaux Arts de Nantes, France, which bought it in 1810. Painted in a tenebrist style, it depicts Saint Jerome at a table in a darkened space. Before him there are a Bible, a rosary, a crucifix, and a skull. Jerome gazes in the direction of light which falls from the upper left.

The dimensions of the painting are 117 cm x 98 cm (46 in. x 38.5 in).

References

1635 paintings
Stom
Paintings in the collection of the Musée d'Arts de Nantes
Paintings by Matthias Stom
Books in art
Skulls in art
Paintings of crucifixes